Sidney Green (born August 1, 1929) is a politician in Manitoba, Canada. He twice ran for the leadership of the New Democratic Party of Manitoba, served in the cabinet of Premier Edward Schreyer, and later formed the Progressive Party of Manitoba.

Biography
Green was born into a Jewish family in the mostly working-class north end of Winnipeg, Manitoba. He graduated from the University of Manitoba's Law School, and subsequently worked as a labour lawyer.  While a student, Green articled with Joseph Zuken, then a Communist school trustee and later an alderman. Despite having some radical tendencies in his early years, Green never became involved with the Communist Party.

On the advice of Stephen Lewis and Lloyd Stinson, Green joined the federal New Democratic Party (NDP) in the early 1960s. He was the party's federal candidate for Winnipeg South in the 1962 election, placing a distant third in a riding that was acknowledged as unwinnable for the party.  Shortly thereafter, Green won election to the municipal council of Winnipeg for a north-end riding, defeating Communist candidate William Kardash and John J. Thomas of the pro-business Metro Election Committee. Green was re-elected in 1964.

Green resigned his seat to contest Winnipeg South again at the federal level in the 1965 election. He became the first NDP or Cooperative Commonwealth Federation candidate to receive over 10,000 votes in the riding, but still placed third.

In 1966, Green won election to the Legislative Assembly of Manitoba for the north-end Winnipeg riding of Inkster. Ironically, he had initially lost the party's nomination to Howard Mitchell, 61 votes to 3. Mitchell withdrew before the election, however, and Green took his place. In the general election, Green finished well ahead of his three opponents, including Communist Party leader William Ross.

During this period, the provincial NDP was led by Russell Paulley, an old-style labour politician not popular among younger members of his caucus. Along with others in the party, Green believed the NDP needed a new leader to become a serious challenger for government. He supported a plan have federal Member of Parliament (MP) Edward Schreyer replace Paulley in 1968. That came to nothing, and on September 3, 1968, Green announced he would seek the party's leadership himself.

Although Green claimed (probably correctly) he was not challenging Paulley on ideological grounds, many interpreted his challenge as being endorsed by the party's radical left. Many members of the NDP's youth wing endorsed Green's campaign for the leadership.

One month later, the remainder of the provincial NDP caucus (aside from Ben Hanuschak, who backed Green) announced they would support Paulley in the leadership challenge, with the understanding he would stand down in favour of Ed Schreyer the following year. With this unusual endorsement, Paulley defeated Green by 213 to 168 votes at a delegated convention.

Green was the first Jewish-Canadian politician to make a serious bid for the leadership of a major party, and later claimed his efforts opened the door for future leadership bids by Dave Barrett and David Lewis.  His campaign was not supported by many other prominent Jewish New Democrats in Winnipeg, however. Green later accused Saul Cherniack, Saul Miller and David Orlikow of promoting "Jewish-fuelled anti-semitism", claiming that a Jewish lawyer would be unelectable in rural Manitoba. Green's relations with Cherniack, Miller and Orlikow deteriorated during the 1968 campaign, and remained poor thereafter.

Green ran against Ed Schreyer for the party's leadership in 1969, in what proved to be a much less divisive campaign.  Schreyer won this contest by 506 votes to 177.

Green was easily re-elected in Inkster in 1969, and held a number of portfolios in Schreyer's government. He was Minister of Health and Social Services from July 15, 1969 to December 18, 1969, Minister of Mines and Natural Resources from December 18, 1969 to March 3, 1972 (the position was renamed Minister of Mines, Resources and Environmental Management in 1971) and Minister of Urban Affairs from September 9, 1971 to March 3, 1972.

On March 3, 1972, Green resigned from cabinet over a disagreement with Edward Schreyer on funding to denominational schools. Schreyer supported limited funding and Green opposed any funding. The issue was subsequently resolved, and Green rejoined cabinet on July 21, 1972, returning to the portfolio of Mines, Resources and Environmental Management. He became Minister responsible for the Manitoba Development Corporation on February 16, 1973, and remained in this position until the Schreyer government was defeated in 1977.

During his time in government, Green was involved in the government's controversial negotiations over the proposed flooding of South Indian Lake. He also publicly opposed an attempt by Russell Paulley (by then Labour Minister) to impose 'back-to-work' legislation on striking transit workers in Winnipeg, in 1976.

After the Schreyer government was defeated in the 1977 election, Green became disillusioned with the direction of the provincial NDP.  He believed the party was becoming dominated by "the trade union movement and militant feminists" (his words), and opposed its plans to introduce anti-scab legislation if re-elected. Despite his roots as a labour lawyer, Green was against what he called "special privileges" for unionized labour.

After Schreyer was appointed Governor General of Canada in 1979, Green stood for the party's interim leadership, but was defeated by Howard Pawley in a vote of caucus members.  At least five of the seven MLAs who supported Green left the NDP during the 1980s.

Green himself left the Manitoba NDP on December 4, 1979, citing the proposed anti-scab legislation as his reason. He sat as an independent MLA until March 3, 1981, when he became one of the founding members of the Progressive Party of Manitoba. The party recognized Green as its leader. MLAs Hanuschak and Bud Boyce were also in the new party.

The Progressive Party was regarded as socialist initially, and supported traditional leftist causes such as full employment and increased profits taxation on resource industries.  The party also opposed "special status" designations for minority groups, however, and was arguably closer to the political right in such matters.

The Progressives hoped to run a full slate of candidates in the 1981 election, but were unsuccessful. All the party's candidates were defeated. Green, who had been re-elected easily in 1973 and 1977, placed a poor third in Inkster, receiving only 783 votes against 6283 for Don Scott of the NDP.

Green continued as leader of the Progressive Party. In 1984, he contested a by-election in the Winnipeg riding of Fort Garry, but finished fourth with 1035 votes (Liberal leader Sharon Carstairs was also a candidate). He ran in Wolseley (another Winnipeg riding) in 1986, this time receiving 347 votes.

The Progressive Party regained some notoriety in the 1988 election by convincing former Premier Douglas Campbell (a veteran of the province's original Progressive Party) to speak at a fund-raising event.  This did not help the party's electoral fortunes, however; all its candidates again were defeated, and Green (running in Kildonan) received only 445 votes.

Green made further unsuccessful bids for the legislature in 1990 and 1992. He was unable to find a successor as party leader in 1995, and dissolved the Progressive Party on July 13 of that year.

Green's political position shifted to the right in the 1980s. In a 1990 advertisement, the Progressive Party argued in support of balanced budgets, and rejected any state sanctioning of "distinct status" for minority groups such as aboriginals and homosexuals. In addition to leading the Progressive Party, Green also continued his law practice throughout the 1980s.  He published his memoirs, Rise and Fall of a Political Animal, in 2003.

In May 2013, Green wrote an editorial advocating the abolition of the Canadian senate.

References 

Schulz, Herbert. Betrayal: Prairie Agricultural Politics in the 1950s . Google Books

1929 births
Living people
New Democratic Party of Manitoba MLAs
University of Manitoba alumni
Winnipeg city councillors
Jewish Canadian politicians
Members of the Executive Council of Manitoba
Progressive Party of Manitoba (1981–1995) politicians
Labour lawyers
Lawyers in Manitoba
Robson Hall alumni